Silvio Marić (born 20 March 1975) is a Croatian football manager and retired player who played as an attacking midfielder. As of October 2022, he is the sporting director of Rudeš.

Club career 
Born in Zagreb, Marić began his professional career at Dinamo Zagreb in 1992. In the autumn of 1998, he appeared for Dinamo Zagreb in all of their six group matches in the UEFA Champions League and secured himself a move to English club Newcastle United on 4 February 1999 for a transfer fee of $5.8 million. He made his Premier League debut for Newcastle United on 10 March 1999 against Nottingham Forest, but never established himself as a regular in the side and, after making 23 Premier League appearances without scoring, moved to Portuguese club Porto in 2000. At Newcastle United, he was the first Croatian player to appear in an FA Cup Final, when he came on as a substitute in the Magpies' 2–0 defeat to Manchester United in the 1999 Final. During the final, with Newcastle trailing 2–0, Marić weakly shot past the post when exceptionally well placed to score. This summed up his Newcastle career in general. He did, however, score twice for Newcastle in their 1999-2000 UEFA Cup campaign, when he netted both home and away against Zürich.

After playing one season for Porto, where he also never became a regular, he made his first comeback to Dinamo Zagreb and subsequently spent two seasons with the club before making another move abroad, to Greek club Panathinaikos in 2003. He subsequently spent two seasons at Panathinaikos and also made nine UEFA Champions League appearances for the club before making his second comeback to Dinamo Zagreb in 2005, signing a two-year contract. However, with his role in the team largely diminished and the fact that he mostly appeared as a substitute, he cancelled his contract upon the end of the 2005–06 season and thus finished his playing career. In his three spells with Dinamo, he appeared in a total of 146 league matches and scored 41 goals.

International career 
Marić made his international debut for the Croatian national team on 30 April 1997 in their 1998 FIFA World Cup qualifier against Greece and scored his first international goal in his second cap against Bosnia and Herzegovina on 6 September 1997 in this same qualifying session. Between 1995 and 1997, he also made several appearances for the Croatian national under-21 team.

He was also a member of the Croatian squad that won the bronze medal at the 1998 FIFA World Cup finals in France and appeared in four matches at the tournament, although he only started the final group match against Argentina. He won a total of 19 international caps for Croatia between 1997 and 2002, but his first international goal also remained his only one. His last appearance for the Croatian national team came on 12 October 2002 in their second Euro 2004 qualifier, which they lost 2–0 to Bulgaria on the road.

Career statistics

International goals
Results list Croatia's goal tally first.

Honours
Dinamo Zagreb
Prva HNL: 1992–93, 1995–96, 1996–97, 1997–98, 2002–03, 2005–06
Croatian Cup: 1996, 1997, 1998, 2002
Croatian Supercup: 2002

Porto
Taça de Portugal: 2001

Panathinaikos
Super League Greece: 2003–04
Greek Cup: 2003–04

Orders
 Order of the Croatian Interlace - 1998

References

External links
 

1975 births
Living people
Footballers from Zagreb
Association football midfielders
Croatian footballers
Croatia under-21 international footballers
Croatia international footballers
1998 FIFA World Cup players
GNK Dinamo Zagreb players
HNK Segesta players
Newcastle United F.C. players
FC Porto players
Panathinaikos F.C. players
FA Cup Final players
Croatian Football League players
Premier League players
Primeira Liga players
Super League Greece players
Croatian expatriate footballers
Expatriate footballers in England
Croatian expatriate sportspeople in England
Expatriate footballers in Portugal
Croatian expatriate sportspeople in Portugal
Expatriate footballers in Greece
Croatian expatriate sportspeople in Greece
Croatian football managers
NK Rudeš managers